Osaze Urhoghide (born 4 July 2000) is a English professional footballer who plays as a defender for Belgian club Oostende on loan from Celtic.

Early life
Urhoghide was born in Rotterdam, the Netherlands  to Nigerian parents and moved to England aged five.

Club career

AFC Wimbledon
Urhoghide signed his first professional contract with AFC Wimbledon on the 6 April 2018.

Sheffield Wednesday
Following his release at the end of the 2018–19 season, he impressed on trial at Championship club Sheffield Wednesday, and signed a contract with the club. He made his first team debut in the FA Cup third round tie against Brighton & Hove Albion, keeping a clean sheet in a 1-0 win. 

On 4 June 2020, he extended his stay a further season by signing a new contract until 2021. He broke back into the team under Neil Thompson and his form won him the clubs February 2021 player of the month. In March 2021, Osaze started to attract interest from other clubs, with Leeds United, Crystal Place, Watford and Club Brugge all reportedly interested in the defender. Sheffield Wednesday confirmed that they had offered him a new contract at the end of the 2020–21 season.

Celtic
On 1 July 2021, Urhoghide signed a four-year contract with Celtic. He made his debut for Celtic in a UEFA Europa League tie against Real Betis on 9 December 2021.

KV Oostende (loan)
On 31 January 2022, Urhoghide joined Oostende on loan until the end of the season, with the option to buy. On 27 July 2022, the loan was renewed for the 2022–23 season.

Career statistics

References

External links

2000 births
Living people]
English footballers
English people of Nigerian descent
Association football defenders
AFC Wimbledon players
Sheffield Wednesday F.C. players
Celtic F.C. players
K.V. Oostende players
English Football League players
Belgian Pro League players
English expatriate footballers
Expatriate footballers in Belgium
English expatriate sportspeople in Belgium